Cancer In Common is a social network connecting cancer survivors, patients and their friends. It enables users to search then communicate privately with other members, based on their type of cancer, age and location.

History 
In an interview, Chris Geiger stated he was diagnosed with Non-Hodgkin lymphoma. When first diagnosed he wanted to read stories  from other cancer patients who had fought the same cancer as him. This was his thinking behind The Cancer Survivors Club book. A common request he got from readers was about various treatments, side effects or wanting to be put in contact with others who had the same type of cancer.

Features

Cancer In Common features social network services such as cancer specific discussion groups, geographically specific events, fundraising, social interaction, and photo sharing. The network does not allow anonymous or pseudonymous interactions. Members must create profiles and can invite others to join their circle of friends.

On August 1, 2015, it was announced CancerInCommon would be closed on September 1, 2015.

See also
The Cancer Survivors Club

References

External links
 Cancer In Common
 The Cancer Survivors Club
 Cancer Buzz - News

British social networking websites
Defunct social networking services
British medical websites